Westmorland is an outer suburb of Christchurch, New Zealand. It is situated mostly on a hillside and is a recent development of the city, dating back to the late 1970s. It is still under development, with the end of Pentonville Close being recently settled with modern family homes typical of middle to upper-middle class New Zealanders, predominantly in the usual bungalow style, called Worsley Estate. There is a road nearby called 'Worsleys Road'. However this is not connected to Worsley Estate at this time. 
Currently there is a lot of development happening at the top of the hill, going under the name of 'Westmorland Heights'. This is the final stage of the Westmorland development, and is expected to be completed in approx 2020, adding 250 homes to the suburb of Westmorland.

Demographics

Westmorland had a population of 2,196 at the 2018 New Zealand census, an increase of 264 people (13.7%) since the 2013 census, and an increase of 522 people (31.2%) since the 2006 census. There were 780 households. There were 1,101 males and 1,092 females, giving a sex ratio of 1.01 males per female. The median age was 46.7 years (compared with 37.4 years nationally), with 393 people (17.9%) aged under 15 years, 330 (15.0%) aged 15 to 29, 1,089 (49.6%) aged 30 to 64, and 384 (17.5%) aged 65 or older.

Ethnicities were 90.4% European/Pākehā, 5.2% Māori, 0.7% Pacific peoples, 7.0% Asian, and 2.5% other ethnicities (totals add to more than 100% since people could identify with multiple ethnicities).

The proportion of people born overseas was 20.5%, compared with 27.1% nationally.

Although some people objected to giving their religion, 51.2% had no religion, 41.4% were Christian, 0.3% were Hindu, 0.7% were Muslim, 0.7% were Buddhist and 0.8% had other religions.

Of those at least 15 years old, 633 (35.1%) people had a bachelor or higher degree, and 162 (9.0%) people had no formal qualifications. The median income was $45,600, compared with $31,800 nationally. The employment status of those at least 15 was that 900 (49.9%) people were employed full-time, 366 (20.3%) were part-time, and 48 (2.7%) were unemployed.

References 

Suburbs of Christchurch